The 1936 Alabama Crimson Tide football team (variously "Alabama", "UA" or "Bama") represented the University of Alabama in the 1936 college football season. It was the Crimson Tide's 43rd overall and 4th season as a member of the Southeastern Conference (SEC). The team was led by head coach Frank Thomas, in his sixth year, and played their home games at Denny Stadium in Tuscaloosa and Legion Field in Birmingham, Alabama. They finished the season with a record of eight wins, zero losses and one tie (8–0–1 overall, 5–0–1 in the SEC).

After Alabama opened the season with three consecutive shutouts against Howard, Clemson and Mississippi State, they suffered their only blemish of the season, a scoreless tie against Tennessee. The Crimson Tide rebounded to win their final five games against , Kentucky, Tulane, Georgia Tech and Vanderbilt. Although they finished undefeated and ranked No. 4 in the final AP Poll, Alabama did not receive an invitation to participate in a postseason bowl game.

Schedule

Game summaries

Howard

Source:

To open the 1936 season, Alabama outgained Howard (now Samford University) in total yards, 294 to 12, and defeated the Bulldogs 34–0 at Denny Stadium. After a scoreless first, Joe Kilgrow scored on a four-yard touchdown run to give the Crimson Tide a 6–0 lead. Alabama then scored two touchdowns in each of the final two quarters to secure the 34–0 victory. Joe Riley scored both third-quarter touchdowns, first on a 27-yard run and the second on a 26-yard run. Kilgrow then scored both of the fourth-quarter touchdowns on a pair of one-yard runs. The victory improved Alabama's all-time record against Howard to 14–0–1.

Clemson

Source:

For the second week in a row Alabama shutout their opponent, and this time it was the Clemson Tigers of the Southern Conference 32–0 in Tuscaloosa. The Crimson Tide took a 12–0 lead in the first quarter on touchdown runs of 15 yards by Gene Blackwell and of five-yards by Herman Caldwell. They would then score a touchdown in each of the three remaining quarters for the 32–0 margin. The touchdown runs were scored by Charlie Holm in the second on a three-yard run, by Young Boozer in the third on a 39-yard run and finally by Joe Kilgrow in the fourth on a five-yard run. The victory improved Alabama's all-time record against Clemson to 6–3.

Mississippi State

Source:

The Crimson Tide entered their annual game against their long-time rival, Mississippi State as a slight underdog that sought redemption against the Maroons after their 20–7 loss the previous year. In what was Alabama's annual homecoming game, they defeated the Maroons 7–0 at Denny Stadium. In a game dominated by both defenses, the only points of the game came in the second quarter. The touchdown was scored by Joe Kilgrow after he received a lateral pass from Joe Riley on a fake punt and returned it 83-yards for the score. The Alabama defense also starred and made eight interceptions of State passes in the game. The victory improved Alabama's all-time record against Mississippi State to 18–5–2.

Tennessee

Source:

Against rival Tennessee, Alabama battled the Volunteers to a 0–0 tie at Legion Field. In a game once again dominated by both defenses, the closest either team came to a score was at the end of the second quarter when Alabama was in position for a touchdown at the Tennessee one-yard line. However, the official call time for the end of the period before Alabama could get another play off. The tie brought Alabama's all-time record against Tennessee to 12–5–2.

Loyola

Source:

In what was the first road game of the season, Alabama made their first trip to New Orleans since the 1921 season and defeated the Loyola Wolfpack of the Dixie Conference 13–6 on a Friday evening. After each team traded punts to start the game, Loyola scored first on a one-yard touchdown run by Clay Calhoun to take a 6–0 lead. Alabama responded on the third play of the drive that ensued when Joe Kilgrow threw a 20-yard pass to Erin Warren that was run an additional 42-yards for a 62-yard touchdown and tied the game at 6–6. After a scoreless second, Alabama scored the game-winning touchdown in the third after they received the ball at the Wolfpack 36-yard line due to a short punt. On this drive, Joe Riley threw an 18-yard touchdown pass to James Nesbit to secure the win in what was Alabama's only all-time game against Loyola.

Kentucky

Source:

On what was their homecoming game, Alabama defeated the Kentucky Wildcats 14–0 at McLean Stadium. After a scoreless first half that saw the Kentucky defense hold Alabama out of the endzone on four occasions from within their own ten-yard line, the Crimson Tide scored two second half touchdowns to win the game. Joe Riley scored both Alabama touchdowns on a 27-yard run in the third and on a 21-yard reverse in the fourth. The victory improved Alabama's all-time record against Kentucky 15–1.

Tulane

Source:

In what was the first game Alabama was ranked and played against a ranked opponent, the Crimson Tide defeated the Tulane Green Wave 34–7 at Legion Field. The Greenies scored first on a 42-yard, Bill Mathis touchdown run in the first quarter to take an early 7–0 lead. However, Alabama responded with five unanswered touchdowns to win the game 34–7. In the first quarter, the Crimson Tide scored on a 54-yard Joe Riley touchdown run and followed that with a 17-yard Joe Kilgrow touchdown pass to Perron Shoemaker to give Alabama a 14–7 lead after one. After Kilgrow threw his second touchdown pass of the game to Erin Warren in the second, James Nesbit scored on a two-yard run to give the Crimson Tide a 28–7 lead as they entered the fourth quarter. In the fourth, Alabama's final points were scored when  Leroy Monsky intercepted a Tulane pass and returned it 25-yards for a touchdown. The victory improved Alabama's all-time record against Tulane to 10–3–1.

This game was noted for being the first regular season Alabama game that was broadcast nationally on two major radio networks. It was broadcast by CBS with Ted Husing as the announcer and by NBC with Bill Slater as the announcer. The national broadcasts were made due to both teams being undefeated and ranked in the AP Poll as they entered the game. The game was also the first in which the Crimson Tide defeated a ranked opponent.

Georgia Tech

Source:

Although outgained in total yardage against Georgia Tech, Alabama defeated the Yellow Jackets 20–16 at Grant Field. After the Crimson Tide scored on a Joe Kilgrow touchdown pass to Herman Caldwell in the first, Alabama scored two second-quarter touchdowns to take a 20–0 halftime lead. In the second, James Nesbit scored on a two-yard run and Kilgrow threw a 13-yard touchdown pass to Perron Shoemaker. The Yellow Jackets scored their first points early in the third after Hal Hughes was tackled for a safety on a punt attempt. On the possession that ensued, T. F. Sims threw a 45-yard touchdown pass to M. J. Konemann to cut the Crimson Tide lead to 20–9. H. H. Appleby then scored the final points of the game with his short touchdown run in the fourth on a drive that featured a 71-yard run by Konemann. The victory improved Alabama's all-time record against Georgia Tech to 10–10–2.

Vanderbilt

Source:

In the season finale on Thanksgiving Day, Alabama defeated the Vanderbilt Commodores 14–6 defeat at Legion Field. Vanderbilt scored first after the received the opening kickoff when Herbert Plasman scored on a ten-yard touchdown on their opening drive. With the score still 6–0 in favor of the Commodores after halftime, the Crimson Tide scored a pair of second half touchdowns to win the game 14–6. In the third, Joe Kilgrow threw a 26-yard touchdown pass to Ben McLeod and in the fourth on a 12-yard Joe Riley touchdown pass to Kilgrow. The victory improved Alabama's all-time record against Vanderbilt to 8–9.

After the season
Following their victory over Vanderbilt in the season finale, Alabama was in contention (along with Pittsburgh and LSU) for a place in the 1937 Rose Bowl opposite Washington. In addition to the Rose, Alabama was also under consideration to compete in the 1937 Sugar Bowl along with the aforementioned Pittsburgh, LSU and Santa Clara. However, on December 3, Rose Bowl officials announced the selection of Pittsburgh and Sugar Bowl officials announced their matchup of LSU and Santa Clara. This resulted in Alabama not playing in a bowl game despite an undefeated record of 8–0–1 and a final poll ranking of No. 4.

Awards
After the season, James Nesbit and Arthur "Tarzan" White selected to various 1936 College Football All-America Teams.

NFL Draft
Several players that were varsity lettermen from the 1936 squad were drafted into the National Football League (NFL) between the 1937 and 1939 drafts. These players included the following:

Personnel
The 1936 coaching staff included former player Bear Bryant in his first year at a coaching position. Bryant came back to Alabama after serving as an assistant coach at Union for their spring practices in early 1936. He later went on to serve as head coach at Maryland, Kentucky, Texas A&M and at Alabama. During his career Bryant won 323 games, appeared in 29 bowl games, won 15 conference championships and six national championships.

Varsity letter winners

Coaching staff

References
General

 

Specific

Alabama
Alabama Crimson Tide football seasons
College football undefeated seasons
Alabama Crimson Tide football